"There! I've Said It Again" is a popular song written and published by Redd Evans and David Mann in 1941. In early 1945, Vaughn Monroe and his Orchestra released Victor 20-1637, which reached the number one position on the Billboard's National Radio Airplay chart for five straight weeks, then no.2 for six more weeks, and a total run of 29 weeks. It finished 1945 as the no. 4 record of the year.

1945 versions
Vaughn Monroe's version of "There! I've Said It Again" reached No. 1 on Billboards chart of "Records Most-Played on the Air", while also reaching No. 1 on Billboards charts of "Best-Selling Popular Retail Records" and no. 2 on "Most-Played Juke Box Records".

Jimmy Dorsey released a version of "There! I've Said It Again" in 1945, which reached No. 8 on Billboards chart of "Records Most-Played on the Air" and No. 12 on Billboards chart of "Most-Played Juke Box Records". A version was also released by The Modernaires with Paula Kelly in 1945, which was a hit that year.

Bobby Vinton version
Bobby Vinton, backed by arranger/conductor Stan Applebaum, recorded and released "There! I've Said It Again" as a single in the fall of 1963. In 1964, Vinton released the song on the album There! I've Said It Again.

Vinton's version topped the Billboard Hot 100 chart on January 4, 1964 and remained there for four weeks. It was the first No. 1 song of 1964, and spent 13 weeks on the Billboard Hot 100 chart. The song also spent five weeks atop the Billboard Middle-Road Singles chart. It was Vinton's third number-one song on both charts, following "Roses Are Red (My Love)" and "Blue Velvet". Vinton's version also reached No. 1 on the Cash Box Top 100, No. 1 on New Zealand's "Lever Hit Parade", No. 5 on Canada's CHUM Hit Parade, and spent 10 weeks on the United Kingdom's Record Retailer chart, reaching No. 34.

Vinton's version was ranked No. 12 on Cash Boxs "Top 100 Chart Hits of 1964".

Chart performance

All-time charts

Other notable versions
Sam Cooke released a version of the song in 1959. Cooke's version spent five weeks on the Billboard Hot 100, reaching No. 81, while reaching No. 25 on Billboards Hot R&B Sides chart.

Al Saxon released a version of the song in 1961, which reached No. 48 on the United Kingdom's Record Retailer chart.

A cover by Mickey Gilley peaked at No. 53 on the Billboard Hot Country Singles chart in 1989.

References

1941 songs
1945 singles
1963 singles
1989 singles
Songs with music by David Mann (songwriter)
Songs with lyrics by Redd Evans
Bobby Vinton songs
Billboard Hot 100 number-one singles
Cashbox number-one singles
Number-one singles in New Zealand
Vaughn Monroe songs